
 is a Japanese record company owned by Clear Sky Corporation.
Established May 3, 2000 to handle the independent release of Hitomi Yaida's debut maxi CD Howling to the Kansai area of Japan, it was the subject of a bidding war amongst the larger recording companies for distribution rights, which was won by Toshiba-EMI.

The distribution contract with Toshiba-EMI was cancelled in September 2005, with Avex Marketing Communications winning the new rights.

Notable Artists
Hitomi Yaida
SATOMI'
Imogen Heap
Mary Lou Lord
Daishi Kataoka (solo artist and label Producer)

See also
 List of record labels
 GMT Records

Notes

External links
 Aozora Records homepage

Japanese record labels
Record labels established in 2000